Darva Khani (also Romanized as Darvā Khānī and Darvākhānī; also known as Darū and Darvā) is a village in Ruydar Rural District, Ruydar District, Khamir County, Hormozgan Province, Iran. At the 2006 census, its population was 337, in 74 families.

References 

Populated places in Khamir County